Svadhisthana (IAST: ,  "Swa means self and "adhishthana  means established), is the second primary chakra according to Hindu Tantrism. This chakra is said to be blocked by fear, especially the fear of death. Opening this chakra can boost creativity, manifested desire and confidence.

Representation
Svadhisthana is illustrated as a white lotus (Nelumbo nucifera). It has six vermilion-colored petals inscribed with syllables: बं baṃ, भं  bhaṃ, मं maṃ, यं yaṃ, रं raṃ and लं laṃ. Inside this lotus is a white crescent moon which represents the water region presided over by the deity Varuna.

The seed mantra, located in the innermost circle, is a moon-white वं vaṃ. Above the mantra that is within the bindu, or dot, is the deity Vishnu. He is dark blue and wears a yellow dhoti. He holds a conch, a mace, a wheel and a lotus. He wears the shrivatsa mark, and the kaustubha gem. He is seated either on a pink lotus, or on the divine eagle Garuda.

His strength is the goddess Rakini. She is black, dressed in red or white and seated on a red lotus. She is commonly depicted with one face and two arms, holding a sword and a shield, or two faced and four armed, and holds a trident, lotus, drum and vajra, or an arrow, skull, drum and axe.

Some schools teach that the divinities of the Svādhishthāna Chakra are Brahmā and Sarasvatī. Brahmā is the creator of the Universe and Saraswati personifies knowledge.

Characteristics
The six petals represent the following modes of consciousness, also known as vrittis: affection, pitilessness, feeling of all-destructiveness, delusion, disdain, and suspicion.

Svadishtana is often associated with pleasure, sense of oneself, relationships, sensuality and procreation. Its element is water and its colour is orange. It is blocked by Guilt. Svadhishthana is associated with the unconscious and with emotion. It is closely related to the Muladhara in that Muladhara is where the different samskaras (potential Karmas) lie dormant, and Svadhishthana is where these Samskaras find expression.

Svadhishthana contains unconscious desires, especially sexual desire. It is said that to raise the kundalini shakti (energy of consciousness) above Svadhishthana is difficult. Many Hindu saints have had to face sexual temptations associated with this chakra.

One who meditates on Svadhishthana is believed to obtain the following siddhis: freedom from enemies, the status of a lord among yogis, eloquence and clarity ("words flowing like nectar in well-reasoned discourse"), loss of fear of water, awareness of astral entities and the ability to taste anything desired for oneself or others.

Association with the body

Svadhisthana is located two finger-widths above the Muladhara chakra (Sanskrit: मूलाधार, IAST: Mūlādhāra, English: "root support") or root chakra which is located in the coccyx (tailbone). Its corresponding kshetram, or, “place,” in front of the body is barely below the belly button.

It is connected with the sense of taste, (the tongue) and with reproduction (the genitals).

It is often associated with the testes and ovaries. They produce the hormones testosterone or estrogen, which influence sexual behaviors. They are stored in areas where genetic information lies dormant, in the same way that samskaras lie dormant within Svadhisthana.

Practices
Practices in kundalini yoga to control and balance the energy in Svadhisthana chakra include vajroli mudra (contraction of the genitals), ashvini mudra (contraction of the anus), and various asanas and pranayamas.

Comparisons
The equivalent chakra in the Vajrayana tantra systems of Tibet is called the "Secret Place" four fingers below the navel. It is red in colour, with 32 downward pointing spokes. Meditation on this point produces great bliss.

According to certain interpretations of Sufism, the spiritual body of a person is defined as an interconnected system (Lataif-e-sitta), in which there is an energy center called the nafs. According to Lataif-e-sitta, the nafs is just below the navel. The nafs incorporates all the elements of a person's "lower self", which is tamed in order to attain closeness to Allah.

Western occultists make the kabbalistic association of Svadhisthana with the Sephirah Yesod. Yesod is also associated with the sexual organs. Its function in the tree of life is to gather the different energies that have been created in the descent of the tree downwards and distribute them to Malkuth, the material world, where the energy can find physical expression.

Alternative names
 Tantra: Adhishthana, Bhima, Shatpatra, Skaddala Padma, Wari Chakra
 Vedas (late Upanishads): Medhra

References

External links
 Svadhisthana - The Seat of Life by Anodea Judith

Chakras
Moon in culture